Nenad Simić (born 16 April 1984) is a Serbian footballer who currently plays with FK Loznica in the Serbian First League.

Playing career  
Simić began his career in 2002 with FK Jedinstvo Donja Mutnica in the Serbian League. In 2003, he played in the Second League of Serbia and Montenegro with Morava Ćuprija. In 2005, he signed with FK Jagodina, and had several loan spells with Radnicki Kragujevac, FK Mladenovac, Sumadija Jagnjilo, FK Novi Pazar, and Sumadija Arandjelovac. He later played with FK Voždovac. In 2012, he played in the Serbian First League with FK Jedinstvo.

During his time in the Serbian First League he also played with  FK Radnik Surdulica, and FK Timok. In 2014, he played abroad with Burlington SC in the Canadian Soccer League. In 2014, he returned to Serbia First League to sign with FK Sloga Kraljevo, and later with FK Loznica in 2015. In 2016, he signed with FK Bežanija, and for the remainder of the season he played in the Serbian League East with FK Jedinstvo Paraćin.

References 

Living people
1984 births
Serbian footballers
FK Novi Pazar players
FK Jagodina players
FK Radnik Surdulica players
FK Timok players
Halton United players
FK Sloga Kraljevo players
FK Loznica players
Serbian First League players
Canadian Soccer League (1998–present) players
Association football midfielders
FK Šumadija Aranđelovac players
FK Voždovac players
FK Jedinstvo Užice players
FK Bežanija players